Paranur railway station is one of the railway stations of the Chennai Beach–Chengalpattu section of the Chennai Suburban Railway Network. It is situated at a distance of 55 km south of Chennai Beach terminus and has an elevation of 42 m above sea level. It serves the neighbourhood of Paranur and the Mahindra World City at New Chennai.

The station is noted for its maintenance by a public–private partnership between Mahindra World City Developers (MWCD) and the Indian Railways, reportedly the first of its kind in the country. MWCD gave the station a makeover after Mahindra World City, an integrated business zone, was developed in the neighbourhood.

History

The lines at the station were electrified on 9 January 1965. On 15 January 1967, all the lines were converted to 25 kV AC.

The station
MWCD developed the station at a cost of  15 million. It also maintains the station. The project includes building and maintenance of the main structure including the ticket counter, waiting room and toilets, fountains, platforms, foot over-bridge, and landscaped stretches of land around the station and near the tracks.

The station was designed by Sheila Sri Prakash of Shilpa Architects.

Traffic
The station serves around 20,000 commuters every day. About 40 percent of MWCD's workforce uses the station.

See also

 Railway stations in Chennai
 Chennai Suburban Railway

References

External links
 Paranur railway station on IndiaRailInfo.com
 Project details of Paranur railway station

Railway stations in Kanchipuram district
Stations of Chennai Suburban Railway